Garland Christian Academy (GCA) is a private preK-12 Christian school in Garland, Texas. As of 2016 it had about 340 students.

Lavon Drive Baptist Church voted to establish the school in 1971 and the school opened in August 1972 with 12 teachers and 136 students. It initially had Kindergarten through 6th grade. Grades 7-11 opened in 1973 and grade 12 opened in 1974.

References

External links
 Garland Christian Academy

High schools in Garland, Texas
1972 establishments in Texas
Educational institutions established in 1972
Private K-12 schools in Dallas County, Texas
Christian schools in Texas